The Lithuanian A Lyga 2009 was the 20th season of top-tier football in Lithuania. The season started on 4 April 2009 and ended on 31 October 2009. Ekranas successfully defended their title.

Promotion and relegation
Šilutė were relegated to the I Lyga after finishing the 2008 season in last place. They were replaced by I Lyga champions Tauras.

Pre-season controversy
The Lithuanian top football division was shaken to its core after FBK Kaunas and Atlantas withdrew their participation on 20 March 2009. Both teams cited serious differences with the Lithuanian Football Federation over the way the league has been led in the past as a reason. This was the second blow to the league within two weeks after Žalgiris were denied a license for this season because of excessive financial problems on 6 March 2009.

As a consequence, the chairman of the National Football Clubs' Association (NFKA), Gintaras Ugianskis, resigned from his post. Further, the organization of the league was put into the hands of the LFF.

The 2009 A Lyga consists of eight teams chosen from all teams of both A Lyga and I Lyga. Teams with a higher 2008 season rank had a preference to enter. Clubs being interested in a participation could submit their application until 26 March 2009.

On 27 March 2009, the LFF announced the three replacement teams. Banga Gargždai, LKKA ir Teledema Kaunas and Kruoja Pakruojis were appointed to the league.
Further, the LFF classified FBK Kaunas and Atlantas to play in the third-tier II Lyga because of "unethical conduct and other irregularities" while Žalgiris were granted a license for the second-level I Lyga.

Clubs

League table

Results
Every team will play each other four times, twice at home and twice on the road, for a total of 28 games.

Top goalscorers
Last updated: 26 October 2009; Source: futbolas.lt

References

LFF Lyga seasons
1
Lith
Lith